Shohei Oka (born 28 May 1990) is a Japanese middle-distance runner who specializes in the 800 meters. He competed for Japan at the 2014 DécaNation. Oka placed third overall in the men's 800 meters at the 2012 Japan Championships in Athletics. He trains with hometown club Wakayama Rikkyo in the Wakayama Prefecture.

References

1990 births
Living people
Japanese male middle-distance runners
Japanese male steeplechase runners
21st-century Japanese people